Salterforth is a civil parish in Pendle, Lancashire, England.  It contains eleven listed buildings that are recorded in the National Heritage List for England.  Of these, one is at Grade II*, the middle grade, and the others are at Grade II, the lowest grade.  Apart from the village of Salterforth, the parish is entirely rural.  Most of the listed buildings are houses and associated structures, and farmhouses.  The Leeds and Liverpool Canal passes through the parish and the listed buildings associated with this are an aqueduct and two bridges.  The other listed building is a public house.

Key

Buildings

References

Citations

Sources

Lists of listed buildings in Lancashire
Buildings and structures in the Borough of Pendle